Italian singer, songwriter, DJ and record producer Giorgio Moroder is one of the originators of  Italo disco and electronic dance music, and his work with synthesizers heavily influenced several music genres such as house, techno and trance music. He has also been dubbed the "Father of Disco".

In the course of his career, Moroder has won three Academy Awards: Best Original Score for Midnight Express (1978), and two Best Original Song awards for "Flashdance...What a Feeling", from the film Flashdance (1983), and for "Take My Breath Away", from Top Gun (1986).  Moroder also won two of his four Grammy Awards for Flashdance: Best Album or Original Score Written for a Motion Picture or a Television Special, and Best Instrumental Composition for the track "Love Theme from Flashdance". His other two awards were for Donna Summer's single "Carry On" and for Daft Punk's album Random Access Memories, which won Album of the Year.  He has been nominated for nine Golden Globe Awards that resulted in four wins: Best Original Score for Midnight Express and Flashdance, and Best Original Song for "Flashdance... What a Feeling" and "Take My Breath Away".

On 20 September 2004 Moroder was honored at the Dance Music Hall of Fame ceremony, held in New York, when he was inducted for his achievements and contributions as a producer. In 2005, Moroder was named a Commendatore Ordine al Merito della Repubblica Italiana, and in 2010, the Italian city of Bolzano awarded him the Grande Ordine al Merito della Provincia autonoma di Bolzano. In 2011, he received the Lifetime Achievement Award by the World Soundtrack Academy.

Awards and nominations

Honors

State and local honors

Other accolades

Footnotes

References 

Moroder, Giorgio